Homophysodes is a genus of moths of the family Crambidae. It contains only one species, Homophysodes morbidalis, which is found from Guatemala south to Panama.

References

Glaphyriinae
Crambidae genera
Taxa named by Harrison Gray Dyar Jr.